Progress M-62, identified by NASA as Progress 27P, was a Progress spacecraft used to resupply the International Space Station. It was a Progress-M 11F615A55 spacecraft, with the serial number 362.

Launch
Progress M-62 was launched by a Soyuz-U carrier rocket from Site 1/5 at the Baikonur Cosmodrome. Launch occurred at 07:12:41 UTC on 23 December 2007.

Docking
The spacecraft docked with the Pirs module at 08:14 UTC on 26 December 2007. The Pirs module had previously been occupied by Progress M-61, which undocked on 22 December 2007. Progress M-62 remained docked for 40 days before undocking at 10:32 UTC on 4 February 2008. Following undocking it conducted Earth observation experiments for eleven days prior to being deorbited. It was deorbited at 09:44 UTC on 15 February 2008. The spacecraft burned up in the atmosphere over the Pacific Ocean, with any remaining debris landing in the ocean at around 13:29 UTC.

Progress M-62 carried supplies to the International Space Station, including food, water and oxygen for the crew and equipment for conducting scientific research.

See also

 List of Progress flights
 Uncrewed spaceflights to the International Space Station

References

Spacecraft launched in 2007
Progress (spacecraft) missions
Spacecraft which reentered in 2008
Supply vehicles for the International Space Station
Spacecraft launched by Soyuz-U rockets